Following are the results of the 2005 TC 2000 season.  The TC 2000 Championship (Turismo Competición 2000) is a touring car racing series held in Argentina since 1979.  The 2005 season was its 27th season.

Final standings

Race calendar and winners

References

External links
Official site (Spanish)

TC 2000 Championship seasons
TC2000
TC2000